Laâyoune-Sakia El Hamra is one of the twelve regions of Morocco. It is mainly located in the disputed territory of Western Sahara: the western part of the region is administered by Morocco and the eastern part by the Sahrawi Arab Democratic Republic. The capital of the region is Laâyoune.

Geography
Laâyoune-Sakia El Hamra borders the region of Guelmim-Oued Noun to the north and Dakhla-Oued Ed-Dahab to the south. It shares its eastern border with Mauritania's Tiris Zemmour Region, and to its west is the Atlantic Ocean. The towns of Tarfaya, El Marsa and Boujdour are located on the Atlantic coast, and the Canary Islands are located offshore. The regional capital Laâyoune is located inland near El Marsa, and the region's second-largest town Smara is located near its geographic centre. The Moroccan Wall runs through the region and the area to its east is under the control of the Sahrawi Arab Democratic Republic.

History
Laâyoune-Sakia El Hamra was formed in September 2015 by attaching Es Semara Province, formerly part of Guelmim-Es Semara region, to the former region of Laâyoune-Boujdour-Sakia El Hamra.

Government
The first president of the regional council, Hamdi Ould Errachid, was elected on 14 September 2015. He is a member of the Istiqlal Party and previously headed the council of the former Laâyoune-Boujdour-Sakia El Hamra region. His uncle of the same name is the mayor of Laayoune. Yahdih Bouchab was appointed governor (wali) of the region on 13 October 2015.

Subdivisions

Laâyoune-Sakia El Hamra consists of four provinces:

 Boujdour Province
 Es Semara Province
 Laâyoune Province
 Tarfaya Province

References

 
Geography of Western Sahara